Genoveffa Franchini is an Italian-American hematologist and retrovirologist. She is a senior investigator in the vaccine branch and head of the animal models and retroviral vaccines section at the National Cancer Institute. Franchini has pioneered research on oncogenes and human retroviruses. She researches HIV vaccine development and translational methods of disease prevention.

Early life and education 
As a teenager in Italy, Franchini intended to conduct service work as a missionary nun. Her focus later shifted to biology and medicine as a means to help patients. She completed a doctor of medicine at University of Modena and Reggio Emilia in 1977. She was a postdoctoral fellow at her alma mater in the hematology institute from 1977 to 1979.

Career 
Franchini is a hematologist and retrovirologist. She began working at the National Cancer Institute (NC) in 1979 as a research fellow. Franchini is a senior investigator in the vaccine branch at NCI's Center for Cancer Research. Since 1997, Franchini is head of the animal models and retroviral vaccines section.

Research 
Franchini has pioneered research on oncogenes and human retroviruses (HTLVs and HIVs). She has made numerous achievements in virology and translational approaches to prevent human diseases caused by retroviruses. Her work has furthered the understanding of HIV and HTLV-1 pathogenesis, leading to the identification and characterization of new viral genes for HIV and HTLV-1 and their functions. Franchini's accomplishments in HIV vaccine development include the pre-clinical that led to the first vaccine trial in 16,000 volunteers in Thailand, that has demonstrated significant, though limited, protection against HIV acquisition. Her basic work in immunological mechanisms of protection furthered the understanding of the efficacy of the currently available smallpox vaccine in primates. She also has pioneered strategies to down-modulate regulators of immune response in HIV-1-infected individuals, using the macaque model of SIV infection.

Awards and honors 
Franchini was elected to the American Society for Clinical Investigation in 1990. In 2007, she was elected to the Association of American Physicians.

References 

Living people
Place of birth missing (living people)
National Institutes of Health people
21st-century American biologists
21st-century American women scientists
American medical researchers
Women medical researchers
American women biologists
Italian medical researchers
20th-century American women scientists
20th-century American biologists
20th-century American women physicians
20th-century American physicians
21st-century American women physicians
21st-century American physicians
20th-century Italian physicians
21st-century Italian physicians
20th-century Italian scientists
21st-century Italian scientists
Italian women biologists
Italian women physicians
American hematologists
Italian hematologists
American virologists
Italian virologists
Women virologists
HIV/AIDS researchers
Italian emigrants to the United States
Expatriate academics in the United States
University of Modena alumni
Members of the American Society for Clinical Investigation
Year of birth missing (living people)
Women hematologists
20th-century Italian women
21st-century Italian women